Charles Hodnett (1861 – April 25, 1890) was a Major League Baseball pitcher from  to . He played for the St. Louis Browns and the St. Louis Maroons.

Hodnett began his career with the American Association's Browns in 1883. He started four games, going 2-2 with a 1.41 earned run average. In 1884, he jumped to the Maroons of the Union Association. As the fifth starter on the team, he went 12-2 with a 2.01 ERA (which ranked seventh in the league). St. Louis won the pennant with a record of 94-19.

Hodnett retired from baseball after that season, due to pain resulting from an ulcerated foot. He died six years later.

References

External links

1861 births
1890 deaths
19th-century baseball players
Major League Baseball pitchers
St. Louis Browns (AA) players
St. Louis Maroons players
Baseball players from St. Louis